John Henderson Burnett (November 1, 1904 – August 12, 1959) was an American professional baseball player who appeared primarily as a shortstop in Major League Baseball (MLB) from 1927 to 1935 for the Cleveland Indians and St. Louis Browns. Burnett holds the record for most hits in a single game in MLB history, with nine, albeit in extra innings.

Biography
Born in Bartow, Florida, Burnett made his major-league debut for the Cleveland Indians at the age of 22 on May 7, 1927, against the Philadelphia Athletics after graduating from the University of Florida. Burnett wore uniform number 1 in all eight of his seasons with the Indians. In 1930, Burnett's first season as an everyday starter, he was batting above .300 into July when, on July 19, he broke his wrist and was sidelined for the season. Without Burnett, the Indians finished eight games above .500.

On July 10, 1932, still playing for the Indians, Burnett set the major-league record for hits in a single game, compiling nine hits in 11 at-bats in an 18-inning game against the Philadelphia Athletics. Burnett's record for most hits in a game still stands. He was also the first player to have more than seven hits in a game that went into extra innings. Since then, only Rocky Colavito in 1962, Cesar Gutierrez in 1970, Rennie Stennett in 1975, and Brandon Crawford in 2016 have collected seven or more hits in single game.

In late 1934, in the waning years of his career, after eight seasons with the Indians, Burnett was traded to the St. Louis Browns for outfielder Bruce Campbell. Wearing number 4, Burnett played only one season for the Browns before being traded to the Cincinnati Reds near the start of the 1936 season for first baseman Jim Bottomley. Burnett never played a game for the Reds, his final major-league appearance having been on September 29, 1935.

Overall during his major-league career, Burnett had a .284 average with nine home runs and 213 runs batted in (RBIs) in 558 MLB games. Defensively, he played 265 games at shortstop, while also making over 100 appearances at third base (133) and second base (103), along with three games in the outfield. As a shortstop, he had a .935 fielding percentage.

Burnett finished his professional career playing three seasons in Minor League Baseball. He spent 1936 with the Toronto Maple Leafs of the International League, 1937 with three different teams (the Portland Beavers of the Pacific Coast League, and two teams in the Texas League), and 1938 with the Columbia Reds of the South Atlantic League. He played at least 320 minor-league games, although records of the era are incomplete. In 1938 and 1939, he served as manager of the Columbia team.

Burnett died in Tampa, Florida, on August 12, 1959, at the age of 54 from acute leukemia.

Nine-hit game
Burnett's nine hits came in 11 at bats on July 10, 1932, while batting second and playing shortstop, as listed below. He also scored four runs and had two RBIs, and defensively committed one error while recording five putouts and five assists. His team lost, as the Athletics defeated the Indians in 18 innings by a score of 18–17.

 Burnett's two-out RBI in the bottom of the ninth inning tied the game, 15–15, resulting in extra innings.

See also 

 List of Major League Baseball single-game hits leaders
 List of Florida Gators baseball players

Notes

References

Further reading

External links 
, or Baseball Almanac

1904 births
1957 deaths
Sportspeople from Bartow, Florida
Baseball players from Florida
Deaths from cancer in Florida
Deaths from acute leukemia
Florida Gators baseball players
Major League Baseball shortstops
Cleveland Indians players
St. Louis Browns players
Terre Haute Tots players
New Orleans Pelicans (baseball) players
Toronto Maple Leafs (International League) players
Portland Beavers players
Dallas Steers players
Tulsa Oilers (baseball) players
Columbia Reds players
Minor league baseball managers
American expatriate baseball players in Canada